Steve Christopher Moses (born August 9, 1989) is an American professional ice hockey forward currently under contract with Swiss club, SC Rapperswil-Jona Lakers of the National League (NL). He has also previously played in the KHL with Russian champions SKA Saint Petersburg. Quickness, scoring ability and shooting are considered to be the strongest sides of his gameplay, though his small size is considered a disadvantage in one-on-one situations.

Playing career

Amateur
From 2005 to 2008, Moses played junior hockey with Boston Junior Bruins in Eastern Junior Hockey League (EJHL) and Empire Junior Hockey League (EmJHL). In the EJHL, Moses tallied a total of 96 points in 97 games.

In 2006, Moses was drafted in the 12th round, 209th overall, by the Quebec Major Junior Hockey League (QMJHL)'s Lewiston Maineiacs to play major junior hockey in the Canadian Hockey League (CHL). Instead, however, Moses opted to enroll at the University of New Hampshire and play for the Wildcats ice hockey team, where he ultimately played from 2008 to 2012.

In the 2010–11 season, Moses and New Hampshire won the Hockey East regular season championship title. The former was the Wildcats' third-highest scorer during the regular season, scoring 14 goals. For his performances, Moses was also selected to Hockey East's All-Academic Team.

In his final season at New Hampshire, in 2011–12, Moses was the team's highest goal-scorer, with 22. He was also the joint-third-highest scorer in the Hockey East, sharing his position with Barry Almeida of Boston College. Being the alternate captain of the Wildcats, Moses was the highest point-scorer on the team, with 35 points (22 goals and 13 assists), along with teammate Nick Sorkin (nine goals and 26 assists). After the season, Moses was awarded with Wildcats' Roger A. Leclerc Trophy (MVP of the team).

Professional
In March 2012, undrafted in any NHL Entry Draft, Moses had an amateur try-out with American Hockey League (AHL) team Connecticut Whale, playing eight regular season and one playoff game, scoring two goals.

On May 14, 2012, while unable to gain any NHL interest, Moses signalled the start of a European career upon signing with Finnish club Jokerit on a one-year-deal. In his debut season in 2012–13, he enjoyed a successful year, contributing 22 goals and 38 points in 55 games. He recorded a hat-trick in a 4–0 victory against the Espoo Blues on December 19, 2012. Moses was subsequently signed to a two-year extension with Jokerit.

In his last season with Jokerit he led the team in their debut season in the Kontinental Hockey League in 2014-15 with 57 points in 60 games. With teammates Petr Koukal and Linus Omark Moses formed one of the most efficient lines in KHL that season, the so-called "LOKOMO line". In regular season Moses set the league's new goal scoring record with 36 goals. After the season Moses opted to end his tenure with Jokerit.

On April 9, 2015, Moses subsequently signed as a free agent to a one-year, $1 million contract with the NHL's Nashville Predators for the 2015–16 season. On September 30, 2015 the Predators reassigned Moses to affiliate the, Milwaukee Admirals of the AHL. With the expectations to push for a NHL recall, Moses was unable to produce offensively with the Admirals, posting 2 goals in 16 games. On November 19, 2015, as a signal his NHL chances with the Predators were limited, Moses KHL's rights were traded by Jokerit to defending champions, SKA Saint Petersburg. On December 3, Moses was placed on unconditional waivers by the Predators for the purpose of a mutual termination. Upon his release from the Predators he was signed two days later for the remainder of the season in a hasty return to the KHL with SKA Saint Petersburg.

Moses played parts of two seasons with SKA, before returning to North America for the 2017–18 season in signing a one-year AHL contract with the Rochester Americans on July 20, 2017. As of December 22, 2017, Moses was suspended indefinitely due to breech of contract. He recorded 7 goals and 16 points in 29 games with the club. On December 25, 2017, it was announced that Moses had agreed to a three-year contract in a return to the KHL with former club Jokerit.

At the conclusion of his contract with Jokerit, Moses ended his second tenure with the club, moving to the Swiss National League in signing a two-year contract with SC Rapperswil-Jona Lakers on March 27, 2020.

Career statistics

Regular season and playoffs

International

Awards and honors

References

External links

1989 births
American expatriate ice hockey players in Finland
American expatriate sportspeople in Russia
American men's ice hockey forwards
Connecticut Whale (AHL) players
Ice hockey players from Massachusetts
Jokerit players
Living people
Milwaukee Admirals players
New Hampshire Wildcats men's ice hockey players
People from Leominster, Massachusetts
Rochester Americans players
SKA Saint Petersburg players
Sportspeople from Worcester County, Massachusetts